Ecstasy Rising is an ABC News television documentary with Peter Jennings on the history of MDMA (3,4-methylenedioxy-N-methylamphetamine) also known as ecstasy. It includes a short history of the drug and criticizes the negative health claims made by the U.S. government.

See also
 Methylenedioxymethamphetamine
 Alexander Shulgin
 Psychedelic therapy
 RAVE Act
 National Institute on Drug Abuse (NIDA)
 Drug Enforcement Administration (DEA)
 Retracted article on neurotoxicity of ecstasy
 Multidisciplinary Association for Psychedelic Studies (MAPS) Non-profit research and educational organization                                     * Rolling Movie

External links
Ecstasy Rising at Google Videos
Jennings, Peter. "Primetime Special: Peter Jennings - Ecstasy Rising." ABC News, April 1, 2004.
Eisner, Bruce. "Ecstasy Rising -- TV Program with ABC's Peter Jennings". www.bruceeisner.com.
Larry King with Peter Jennings (Ecstasy Rising).
Erowid. Summary & Review of "Ecstasy Rising". www.erowid.org.
ABC World News. Ecstasy Rising: A Special Report.

American documentary television films
2004 films
2000s English-language films
2000s American films